Elizabeth Karlsen (born 1960) is a British film producer. She co-founded Number 9 Films in 2002 with production partner and husband Stephen Woolley.

Karlsen's producing credits include Terence Davies’ The Neon Bible, starring Gena Rowlands and selected for Cannes competition; Mark Herman’s Little Voice, nominated for six Golden Globe Awards, six BAFTA Awards and an Academy Award; the HBO single drama Mrs. Harris, starring Annette Bening and Ben Kingsley, nominated for 12 Primetime Emmys, three Golden Globes, and a Producers Guild of America Award and for which Karlsen received the Women's Image Network Award; the BAFTA-nominated Great Expectations, directed by Mike Newell, starring Ralph Fiennes and Helena Bonham Carter; Byzantium, directed by Neil Jordan, starring Saoirse Ronan; and Made in Dagenham, nominated for three BAFTAs. She also produced the international box office success Ladies in Lavender, starring Maggie Smith and Judi Dench, and co-produced Neil Jordan's The Crying Game, nominated for six Academy Awards.

Her latest films − Carol, written by Phyllis Nagy, directed by Todd Haynes and starring Cate Blanchett and Rooney Mara, and Youth, directed by Paolo Sorrentino, starring Michael Caine and Harvey Keitel − premiered in main competition at the 2015 Cannes Film Festival. Projects in development include an original project from Caméra d'Or winner Anthony Chen and a co-production with Killer Films, written and directed by Wash West.

Karlsen has served on the board of EM Media, the Edinburgh Festival and is currently Chair of Women in Film & Television (UK).

In 2019 she was awarded the BAFTA Outstanding British Contribution to Cinema Award, together with Stephen Woolley.

Number 9 films
Number 9 Films was co-founded by Elizabeth Karlsen and Stephen Woolley after a long collaboration at both Palace and Scala Productions. The company is one of the UK's leading independent production companies forging relationships with a wide range of talent in the UK, across Europe and in the States.

Films produced under the Number 9 Films banner include Made in Dagenham, which was made into a West End musical in 2014, Byzantium, Great Expectations, How To Lose Friends & Alienate People, Sounds Like Teen Spirit, Breakfast on Pluto, Mrs. Harris, Stoned, and And When Did You Last See Your Father?.

Number 9 Films’ most recent productions are Carol, written by Phyllis Nagy, directed by Todd Haynes starring Cate Blanchett and Rooney Mara. Paolo Sorrentino’s Youth, starring Michael Caine, Harvey Keitel, and Jane Fonda, and Hyena, which opened the Edinburgh International Film Festival.

Current productions include On Chesil Beach, screenplay by Ian McEwan and directed by Dominic Cooke, The Limehouse Golem, written by Jane Goldman and directed by Juan Carlos Medina. and Their Finest, written by Gaby Chiappe, directed by Lone Scherfig. Colette starring Keira Knightley and Dominic West was filmed in 2017 and set for release in late 2018.

Filmography as producer
Director's name in brackets after film title.

 2021: Mothering Sunday (Eva Husson)
 2018: Colette (Wash Westmoreland)
 2017: On Chesil Beach (Dominic Cooke) 
 2017: The Limehouse Golem (Juan Carlos Medina)
 2016: Their Finest (Lone Scherfig)
 2015: Carol (Todd Haynes)
 2015: Youth (Paolo Sorrentino) (co-producer) 
 2014: Hyena (Gerard Johnson)
 2012: Great Expectations (Mike Newell)
 2012: Byzantium (Neil Jordan)
 2012: Midnight's Children (Deepa Mehta) (co-producer) 
 2010: Made in Dagenham (Nigel Cole)
 2009: Perrier's Bounty (Ian Fitzgibbon) 
 2008: How to Lose Friends & Alienate People (Robert B. Weide)
 2008: Sounds Like Teen Spirit (Jamie Jay Johnson)
 2007: And When Did You Last See Your Father? (Anand Tucker)
 2006: Sixty Six (Paul Weiland)
 2005: Mrs. Harris (Phyllis Nagy) (executive producer)
 2004: Ladies in Lavender (Charles Dance)
 2000: Purely Belter (Mark Herman)
 1998: Little Voice (Mark Herman)
 1996: Hollow Reed (Angela Pope) 
 1995: The Neon Bible (Terence Davies)
 1992: The Crying Game (Neil Jordan) (co-producer) 
 1991: The Pope Must Diet (Peter Richardson) (co-producer) 
 1990: Hardware (Richard Stanley) (supervising producer)

References

External links
 Number 9 Films
 
 
 

1960 births
Living people
British film producers
Businesspeople from New York City
British film production company founders
BAFTA Outstanding British Contribution to Cinema Award